AMPL (A Mathematical Programming Language) is an algebraic modeling language to describe and solve high-complexity problems for large-scale mathematical computing (i.e., large-scale optimization and scheduling-type problems).
It was developed by Robert Fourer, David Gay, and Brian Kernighan at Bell Laboratories.
AMPL supports dozens of solvers, both open source and commercial software, including CBC, CPLEX, FortMP, MINOS, IPOPT, SNOPT, KNITRO, and LGO. Problems are passed to solvers as nl files.
AMPL is used by more than 100 corporate clients, and by government agencies and academic institutions.

One advantage of AMPL is the similarity of its syntax to the mathematical notation of optimization problems. This allows for a very concise and readable definition of problems in the domain of optimization. Many modern solvers available on the NEOS Server (formerly hosted at the Argonne National Laboratory, currently hosted at the University of Wisconsin, Madison) accept AMPL input. According to the NEOS statistics AMPL is the most popular format for representing mathematical programming problems.

Features
AMPL features a mix of declarative and imperative programming styles. Formulating optimization models occurs via declarative language elements such as sets, scalar and multidimensional parameters, decision variables, objectives and constraints, which allow for concise description of most problems in the domain of mathematical optimization.

Procedures and control flow statements are available in AMPL for
 the exchange of data with external data sources such as spreadsheets, databases, XML and text files
 data pre- and post-processing tasks around optimization models
 the construction of hybrid algorithms for problem types for which no direct efficient solvers are available.

To support re-use and simplify construction of large-scale optimization problems, AMPL allows separation of model and data.

AMPL supports a wide range of problem types, among them:
 Linear programming
 Quadratic programming
 Nonlinear programming
 Mixed-integer programming
 Mixed-integer quadratic programming with or without convex quadratic constraints
 Mixed-integer nonlinear programming
 Second-order cone programming
 Global optimization
 Semidefinite programming problems with bilinear matrix inequalities
 Complementarity theory problems (MPECs) in discrete or continuous variables
 Constraint programming

AMPL invokes a solver in a separate process which has these advantages:
 User can interrupt the solution process at any time
 Solver errors do not affect the interpreter
 32-bit version of AMPL can be used with a 64-bit solver and vice versa
Interaction with the solver is done through a well-defined nl interface.

Availability
AMPL is available for many popular 32- and 64-bit operating systems including Linux, macOS, Solaris, AIX, and Windows.
The translator is proprietary software maintained by AMPL Optimization LLC. However, several online services exist, providing free modeling and solving facilities using AMPL. A free student version with limited functionality and a free full-featured version for academic courses are also available.

AMPL can be used from within Microsoft Excel via the SolverStudio Excel add-in.

The AMPL Solver Library (ASL), which allows reading nl files and provides the automatic differentiation, is open-source. It is used in many solvers to implement AMPL connection.

Status history
This table present significant steps in AMPL history.

A sample model
A transportation problem from George Dantzig is used to provide a sample AMPL model. This problem finds the least cost shipping schedule that meets requirements at markets and supplies at factories.

 set Plants;
 set Markets;

 # Capacity of plant p in cases
 param Capacity{p in Plants};

 # Demand at market m in cases
 param Demand{m in Markets};

 # Distance in thousands of miles
 param Distance{Plants, Markets};

 # Freight in dollars per case per thousand miles
 param Freight;

 # Transport cost in thousands of dollars per case
 param TransportCost{p in Plants, m in Markets} :=
     Freight * Distance[p, m] / 1000;

 # Shipment quantities in cases
 var shipment{Plants, Markets} >= 0;

 # Total transportation costs in thousands of dollars
 minimize cost:
     sum{p in Plants, m in Markets} TransportCost[p, m] * shipment[p, m];

 # Observe supply limit at plant p
 s.t. supply{p in Plants}: sum{m in Markets} shipment[p, m] <= Capacity[p];

 # Satisfy demand at market m
 s.t. demand{m in Markets}: sum{p in Plants} shipment[p, m] >= Demand[m];

 data;

 set Plants := seattle san-diego;
 set Markets := new-york chicago topeka;

 param Capacity :=
     seattle   350
     san-diego 600;

 param Demand :=
     new-york 325
     chicago  300
     topeka   275;

 param Distance : new-york chicago topeka :=
     seattle        2.5      1.7     1.8
     san-diego      2.5      1.8     1.4;

 param Freight := 90;

Solvers
Here is a partial list of solvers supported by AMPL:

See also
 sol (format)
 GNU MathProg (previously known as GMPL) is a subset of AMPL supported by the GNU Linear Programming Kit

References

External links
 
 Prof. Fourer's home page at Northwestern University

1990 software
Computer algebra systems
Mathematical modeling
Mathematical optimization software
Numerical programming languages
Scripting languages
Text-oriented programming languages
Programming languages created in 1985
Proprietary cross-platform software